Pekka Saravo (born 13 November 1979) is a Finnish former professional ice hockey defender. He played for the Tappara of the SM-liiga between 2000-2006 and 2009-2017.

Playing career
Saravo played five full seasons for Tappara in 2000-2006 before moving to Luleå HF in Sweden. After three years there he played one season with another Elitserien team, Linköpings HC. In 2009 he returned to Tappara, signing a six-year contract with the club. Saravo has also played for the Finland men's national ice hockey team. After the 2016-2017 season, Saravo ended his player career.

Honours

 Finnish championship with Tappara (2003, 2016, 2017)
 Finnish silver medal with Tappara (2001, 2002, 2013, 2014, 2015)
 Silver medal at the Ice Hockey World Championships (2007)
 Bronze medal at the Ice Hockey World Championships (2006)

References

External links

1979 births
Living people
Tappara players
Finnish ice hockey defencemen
People from Rovaniemi
Sportspeople from Lapland (Finland)